Maryland Route 547 (MD 547) is a state highway in the U.S. state of Maryland. The highway runs  from MD 355 in North Bethesda east to MD 185 in Kensington. MD 547 connects North Bethesda and Kensington with Garrett Park in central Montgomery County. The highway was constructed in the early 1930s.

Route description

MD 547 begins as an intersection with MD 355 (Rockville Pike) opposite the entrance to Georgetown Preparatory School in North Bethesda. The state highway heads east as Strathmore Avenue, a two-lane undivided road that passes the grounds of Strathmore, which features a namesake mansion and music center, to the south.  After passing the Academy of the Holy Cross, MD 547 enters the town of Garrett Park. The highway passes through the Garrett Park Historic District several blocks to the south of the Garrett Park station on MARC's Brunswick Line. After serving as the town's main street, MD 547 veers southeast and its name changes to Knowles Avenue. The route enters Rock Creek Park, where the highway traverses Rock Creek and intersects Beach Drive. At its junction with Summit Avenue, MD 547 enters the town of Kensington, where it reaches its eastern terminus at MD 185 (Connecticut Avenue). Knowles Avenue continues east for a block before ending at Armory Avenue in the Kensington Historic District.

History
Garrett Park Road was resurfaced with macadam and widened with concrete shoulders from U.S. Route 240 (now MD 355) east to the Kensington town limit at Summit Avenue between 1931 and 1933. MD 547's bridge across Rock Creek was completed in 1932. In 1936, the state highway was extended east two blocks to the new alignment of MD 193 (now MD 185). That highway's present course through Kensington was completed as part of a railroad grade separation project that same year. MD 547 has had only minor changes since the 1930s.

Junction list

See also

References

External links

MDRoads: MD 547

547
Maryland Route 547